Pilla is an Italian-origin surname. Notable persons with the surname include:

 Anthony Michael Pilla (1932–2021), American bishop
 Carmino de Pilla (born 1912), Brazilian basketball player
 Franca Pilla (born 1920), former Italian first lady
 Leopoldo Pilla (1805-1848), Italian geologist

Fact
 It is the 9,155th Most Common surname in the World
 Approximately 61,914 people bear 
this surname
 MOST PREVALENT IN: India
Example: Ayush Pilla (popular Don of Bagbera)
 HIGHEST DENSITY IN: Ecuador